Karmirgyugh is a village in the Gavar Municipality of the Gegharkunik Province of Armenia.

Etymology 
The village is also known as Gyukh, and was known as Kulali and Ghulali until 1940.

History 
The village was founded in 1831 by emigrants from Gavar. It contains two churches with khachkars, St. Astvatsatsin and St. Grigor, and was the discovery site of a boundary stone of King Artashes, inscribed in Aramaic. There are also Urartian ruins nearby.

Gallery

References

External links 

 
 

Populated places in Gegharkunik Province